Scott Campbell (born March 24, 1945 in Michigan) is an American writer. He lives in Boston and works as Director of Communications in the MIT School of Architecture and Planning. Campbell holds a Masters in Creative Writing from Vermont College.

Early life
Scott Campbell received his undergraduate degree in English from Ohio University, completed his graduate work in Public Communications at Boston University, and completed his education with a Masters in Creative Writing from Vermont College.

Career
Campbell's early career spans from being a producer for a Boston ad agency to a talent agent while as a restaurant waiter before pursuing his freelance writing. Campbell has taught writing at MIT and Emerson College. He lives in Jamaica Plain, Boston, and works as Director of Communications in the School of Architecture and Planning. His book Aftermath, which was inspired by trending suicides in the gay community, was filmed by Caroline Link in 2008 in Germany as A Year Ago in Winter (German: Im Winter ein Jahr). he also wrote the book Touched in 1996.

Bibliography
 Scott Campbell: Aftermath (novel) 2009, 
 Scott Campbell: Touched  (novel) 1996, 
 Scott Campbell, Phyllis R. Silverman: Widower: When Men are Left Alone, 1987,

References

External links

20th-century American novelists
1945 births
Living people
Ohio University alumni
Boston University College of Communication alumni
Vermont College of Fine Arts alumni
MIT School of Humanities, Arts, and Social Sciences faculty
21st-century American novelists
American male novelists
20th-century American male writers
21st-century American male writers
Novelists from Massachusetts
People from Jamaica Plain